The Harrisburg Transportation Center (HTC, formerly Pennsylvania Station, Harrisburg or Harrisburg Central Railroad Station) is a railway station and transportation hub in Harrisburg, Pennsylvania. It is located on the eastern edge of Downtown Harrisburg between the intersections of Aberdeen and Market Streets and 4th and Chestnut Streets. 

The well-situated station is the primary hub for passenger rail and intercity bus services in the Harrisburg metropolitan area and South Central Pennsylvania.

History
 The current station is the third on the site. Though technically a union station (meaning it was used by several railways), it was never identified as such in publications such as the Official Guide of the Railroads and Steam Navigation Lines or Pennsylvania Railroad Timetables. 

The first two stations were shared by the Pennsylvania Railroad (PRR), Reading Railroad, Northern Central Railway (NCR), and the Cumberland Valley Railroad (CVR). The third (and current) station excluded the Reading Railroad, which built its own station in 1856, and the CVR maintained a small depot adjoining the much larger NCR/PRR station. The CVR station was razed sometime in the late 1960s or early 1970s. The Reading Railroad discontinued passenger service into its Harrisburg station in the 1950s and its station was torn down in the early 1960s to make room for a new post office; however, it continued passenger service on the Queen of the Valley. The last northbound train bound for Sunbury, Williamsport and Buffalo was the Penn Central's unnamed successor to the Buffalo Day Express,  ending in 1971. 

The last Erie-bound PRR trains were in 1965 before the Northern Express and Southern Express were diverted to Buffalo.

The current station was built by PRR in 1887 and significantly rebuilt with its distinctive barn roof in 1905 following a serious fire in 1904. 

It was listed on the National Register of Historic Places in 1975, and is also designated as a National Historic Landmark. The station is one of the few railway stations in the United States that still has a train shed above the tracks. It also has a red brick exterior, unlike many of the still-used U.S. railway stations built slightly later in the early 1900s that have white stone facing, such as 30th Street Station in Philadelphia and Union Station in Washington, D.C.

Building usage
The building, which is owned by Amtrak and managed and operated by the Harrisburg Redevelopment Authority, contains office space above the building's main lobby that is used by various tenants. It also contains a moderately large meeting room called the Pennsylvania Room that can be used for meetings and other large gatherings. 

Passenger facilities are currently limited, but the station does have a newsstand on the first floor that sells newspapers, magazines, food, and beverages. It also has various food and beverage vending machines in the intercity bus terminal portion of the building on the basement floor. Non-retail facilities include small lockers on the basement floor for short-term personal storage and both restrooms and payphones on both the first and basement floors.  One of the station's tracks features a Pennsylvania RR GG1 locomotive on display, which can be viewed by the passengers waiting on the adjoining platforms.

Transportation services

Intercity rail

Amtrak provides service to the station via the Keystone Service and Pennsylvanian routes, which operate along the Keystone Corridor and Northeast Corridor. The Harrisburg Transportation Center is the western terminus of Amtrak's Keystone Service, which provides the bulk of the Amtrak service to and from Harrisburg. Primary cities served on Amtrak to and from Harrisburg include Lancaster, Philadelphia, and New York to the east and Altoona, Johnstown, and Pittsburgh to the west. Both staffed and Quik-Trak machine ticket service are available for all departures and red cap service is also available. 

In Federal Fiscal Year 2018, it was the third busiest Amtrak station in Pennsylvania and 22nd busiest in the United States. It ranks just behind Lancaster Station in both categories (Lancaster is 2nd and 21st respectively). It is one of the busiest Amtrak stations serving a metropolitan area with fewer than two million people, mainly due to the large number of passengers traveling between this station and Philadelphia.

Intercity bus
There are two intercity bus operators (Greyhound Lines and Fullington Trailways) that provide service to the station. Some of the key cities and large towns served with one-seat rides by each bus operator are as follows:

In Pennsylvania
Greyhound Lines - Allentown, Altoona, Easton, Johnstown, Norristown, Lewistown, Philadelphia, Pittsburgh, State College, York
Fullington Trailways - Lewistown, State College, Hazleton, Pottsville, Scranton, Wilkes-Barre

Outside of Pennsylvania
Greyhound Lines - Columbus, Dayton, Indianapolis, Newark, New York, St. Louis, Baltimore, Washington

Fullington Trailways - Makes connections via Scranton to Greyhound for points in Upstate New York.

With both Greyhound and Fullington Trailways, many in-state and out-of-state cities and towns beyond those listed can be reached via transfers.

Connecting services
The local public transit operator in the Harrisburg area, Capital Area Transit (CAT), has many local and express bus routes that stop either along Aberdeen Street almost immediately outside the Transportation Center or 1/2 block away on Market Street between 4th Street and Aberdeen Street. These nearby CAT stops that are within easy walking distance of the Harrisburg Transportation Center enable convenient transfers between local public transit and intercity rail and bus services.

The public transit provider in York County, Rabbit Transit, operates its commuter-oriented RabbitEXPRESS bus service on weekdays between the city of York and downtown Harrisburg.  Like the Capital Area Transit buses, the RabbitEXPRESS does not stop at the HTC itself but does have stops within one block of the facility.

Finally, R & J Transportation, a charter/tour bus company, has scheduled weekday, line route commuter service between Schuylkill County and downtown Harrisburg. R & J has stops within one block of the HTC, though no tickets for R & J's service are available at the Transportation Center.

Gallery

See also

 Pennsylvania Railroad GG1 Streamlined Electric Locomotive #4859

References

External links

Harrisburg Transportation Center (USA RailGuide -- TrainWeb)

Amtrak stations in Pennsylvania
Bus stations in Pennsylvania
Buildings and structures in Harrisburg, Pennsylvania
Transit centers in the United States
Transportation in Harrisburg, Pennsylvania
Philadelphia to Harrisburg Main Line
National Historic Landmarks in Pennsylvania
Railway stations on the National Register of Historic Places in Pennsylvania
Railway stations in the United States opened in 1887
Railroad-related National Historic Landmarks
Historic American Engineering Record in Pennsylvania
Colonial Revival architecture in Pennsylvania
National Register of Historic Places in Harrisburg, Pennsylvania
Transportation buildings and structures in Dauphin County, Pennsylvania
Former Pennsylvania Railroad stations